Rupena W. Parkinson is a New Zealand rugby union player. His position of choice is Centre.

Tasman
Parkinson was named in the 2018 Tasman Mako squad.

References

Living people
New Zealand rugby union players
1998 births
Tasman rugby union players
Rugby union centres